Magda Rezlerová (born 9 August 1982 in Turnov) is a Czech biathlete. She represented the Czech Republic at the 2010 Winter Olympics.

References

External links

1982 births
Czech female biathletes
Olympic biathletes of the Czech Republic
Biathletes at the 2010 Winter Olympics
Biathletes at the 2006 Winter Olympics
Biathletes at the 2002 Winter Olympics
Living people
People from Turnov
Sportspeople from the Liberec Region